Amit Singh may refer to:
 Amit Singh (cricketer)
 Amit Singh (scientist)